Deer Creek Grove is a small giant sequoia grove located in the Deer Creek watershed of the Giant Sequoia National Monument in the western Sierra Nevada of California. The grove is located near the end of a steep  trail south from the end of Deer Creek Mill Road. It is the southernmost giant sequoia grove.

The grove is attractively situated about halfway up a pine-covered mountain that rises above a valley of grassy foothills. The grove consists of a scattered collection of old-growth giant sequoias on a sheltered east-facing slope.

While the present day distribution of this species is limited to a small area of California, it was once much more widely distributed in prehistoric times, and was a reasonably common species in North American and Eurasian coniferous forests until its range was greatly reduced by the last ice age.

This grove was heavily impacted by the Windy Fire in 2021, with over half the grove burning at high severity.

Noteworthy trees
 Wishbone Tree - a giant sequoia featuring a hole big enough to ride a horse through. The hole was formed by an intense wildfire sometime in the distant past.

See also
List of giant sequoia groves

References

Giant sequoia groves
Protected areas of Tulare County, California
Sequoia National Forest